Mordellistena daurica is a beetle in the genus Mordellistena of the family Mordellidae. It was described in 1860 by Motsch.

References

daurica
Beetles described in 1860